The bigeye poacher (Bathyagonus pentacanthus), also known commonly as the bigeye starsnout or the bigeye starsnout poacher, is a fish in the family Agonidae. It was described by Charles Henry Gilbert in 1890. It is a marine, subtropical fish which is known from the Gulf of Alaska to southern California, USA, in the northern Pacific Ocean. It dwells at a depth range of 110–910 metres, and inhabits soft bottoms. Males can reach a maximum total length of 23 centimetres.

The Bigeye poacher is preyed on by the Pacific cod (Gadus macrocephalus).

References

Bigeye poacher
Fish described in 1890